In differential geometry, a G-structure on an n-manifold M, for a given structure group G, is a principal G-subbundle of the tangent frame bundle FM (or GL(M)) of M.

The notion of G-structures includes various classical structures that can be defined on manifolds, which in some cases are tensor fields. For example, for the orthogonal group, an O(n)-structure defines a Riemannian metric, and for the special linear group an SL(n,R)-structure is the same as a volume form.  For the trivial group, an {e}-structure consists of an absolute parallelism of the manifold.

This is called reduction of the structure group (to ).

Several structures on manifolds, such as a complex structure, a symplectic structure, or a Kähler structure, are G-structures with an additional integrability condition.

Reduction of the structure group
This is called reduction of the structure group (to ), and makes sense for any map , which need not be an inclusion map (despite the terminology).

Definition 
In the following, let  be a topological space,  topological groups and a group homomorphism .

In terms of concrete bundles 

In terms of classifying spaces 
Given a map , where  is the classifying space for -bundles, a reduction of the structure group is a map  and a homotopy .

Properties and examples 
Reductions of the structure group do not always exist. If they exist, they are usually not essentially unique, since the isomorphism  is an important part of the data.

As a concrete example, every even-dimensional real vector space is isomorphic to the underlying real space of a complex vector space: it admits a linear complex structure. A real vector bundle admits an almost complex structure if and only if it is isomorphic to the underlying real bundle of a complex vector bundle. This is then a reduction along the inclusion GL(n,C) → GL(2n,R)

In terms of transition maps, a G-bundle can be reduced if and only if the transition maps can be taken to have values in H. Note that the term reduction is misleading: it suggests that H is a subgroup of G, which is often the case, but need not be (for example for spin structures): it's properly called a lifting.

More abstractly, "G-bundles over X" is a functor in G: Given a Lie group homomorphism H → G, one gets a map from H-bundles to G-bundles by inducing (as above). Reduction of the structure group of a G-bundle B is choosing an H-bundle whose image is B.

The inducing map from H-bundles to G-bundles is in general neither onto nor one-to-one, so the structure group cannot always be reduced, and when it can, this reduction need not be unique. For example, not every manifold is orientable, and those that are orientable admit exactly two orientations.

If H is a closed subgroup of G, then there is a natural one-to-one correspondence between reductions of a G-bundle B to H and global sections of the fiber bundle B/H obtained by quotienting B by the right action of H.  Specifically, the fibration B → B/H is a principal H-bundle over B/H.  If σ : X →  B/H is a section, then the pullback bundle BH = σ−1B is a reduction of B.

G-structures 
Every vector bundle of dimension  has a canonical -bundle, the frame bundle. In particular, every smooth manifold has a canonical vector bundle, the tangent bundle.

Examples 
The following examples are defined for real vector bundles, particularly the tangent bundle of a smooth manifold.

Some -structures are defined terms of others: Given a Riemannian metric on an oriented manifold, a -structure for the 2-fold cover  is a spin structure. (Note that the group homomorphism here is not an inclusion.)

Principal bundles 
Although the theory of principal bundles plays an important role in the study of G-structures, the two notions are different.  A G-structure is a principal subbundle of the tangent frame bundle, but the fact that the G-structure bundle consists of tangent frames is regarded as part of the data.  For example, consider two Riemannian metrics on Rn.  The associated O(n)-structures are isomorphic if and only if the metrics are isometric.  But, since Rn is contractible, the underlying O(n)-bundles are always going to be isomorphic as principal bundles because the only bundles over contractible spaces are trivial bundles.

This fundamental difference between the two theories can be captured by giving an additional piece of data on the underlying G-bundle of a G-structure: the solder form.  The solder form is what ties the underlying principal bundle of the G-structure to the local geometry of the manifold itself by specifying a canonical isomorphism of the tangent bundle of M to an associated vector bundle.  Although the solder form is not a connection form, it can sometimes be regarded as a precursor to one.

In detail, suppose that Q is the principal bundle of a G-structure.  If Q is realized as a reduction of the frame bundle of M, then the solder form is given by the pullback of the tautological form of the frame bundle along the inclusion.  Abstractly, if one regards Q as a principal bundle independently of its realization as a reduction of the frame bundle, then the solder form consists of a representation ρ of G on Rn and an isomorphism of bundles θ : TM → Q ×ρ Rn.

Integrability conditions and flat G-structures 
Several structures on manifolds, such as a complex structure, a symplectic structure, or a Kähler structure, are G-structures (and thus can be obstructed), but need to satisfy an additional integrability condition. Without the corresponding integrability condition, the structure is instead called an "almost" structure, as in an almost complex structure, an almost symplectic structure, or an almost Kähler structure.

Specifically, a symplectic manifold structure is a stronger concept than a G-structure for the symplectic group. A symplectic structure on a manifold is a 2-form ω on M that is non-degenerate (which is an -structure, or almost symplectic structure), together with the extra condition that dω = 0; this latter is called an integrability condition.

Similarly, foliations correspond to G-structures coming from block matrices, together with integrability conditions so that the Frobenius theorem applies.

A flat G-structure is a G-structure P having a global section (V1,...,Vn) consisting of commuting vector fields.  A G-structure is integrable (or locally flat) if it is locally isomorphic to a flat G-structure.

Isomorphism of G-structures 
The set of diffeomorphisms of M that preserve a  G-structure is called the automorphism group of that structure. For an O(n)-structure they are the group of isometries of the Riemannian metric and for an SL(n,R)-structure volume preserving maps.

Let P be a G-structure on a manifold M, and Q a G-structure on a manifold N.  Then an isomorphism of the G-structures is a diffeomorphism f : M → N such that the pushforward of linear frames f* : FM → FN restricts to give a mapping of P into Q.  (Note that it is sufficient that Q be contained within the image of f*.)  The G-structures P and Q are locally isomorphic if M admits a covering by open sets U and a family of diffeomorphisms fU : U → f(U) ⊂ N such that fU induces an isomorphism of P|U → Q|f(U).

An automorphism of a G-structure is an isomorphism of a G-structure P with itself.  Automorphisms arise frequently in the study of transformation groups of geometric structures, since many of the important geometric structures on a manifold can be realized as G-structures.

A wide class of equivalence problems can be formulated in the language of G-structures.  For example, a pair of Riemannian manifolds are (locally) equivalent if and only if their bundles of orthonormal frames are (locally) isomorphic G-structures.  In this view, the general procedure for solving an equivalence problem is to construct a system of invariants for the G-structure which are then sufficient to determine whether a pair of G-structures are locally isomorphic or not.

Connections on G-structures 

Let Q be a G-structure on M.   A principal connection on the principal bundle Q induces a connection on any associated vector bundle: in particular on the tangent bundle.  A  linear connection ∇ on TM arising in this way is said to be compatible with Q. Connections compatible with Q are also called adapted connections.

Concretely speaking, adapted connections can be understood in terms of a moving frame.  Suppose that Vi is a basis of local sections of TM (i.e., a frame on M) which defines a section of Q.  Any connection ∇ determines a system of basis-dependent 1-forms ω via

∇X Vi = ωij(X)Vj

where, as a matrix of 1-forms, ω ∈ Ω1(M)⊗gl(n).  An adapted connection is one for which ω takes its values in the Lie algebra g of G.

Torsion of a G-structure 
Associated to any G-structure is a notion of torsion, related to the torsion of a connection.  Note that a given G-structure may admit many different compatible connections which in turn can have different torsions, but in spite of this it is possible to give an independent notion of torsion of the G-structure as follows.

The difference of two adapted connections is a 1-form on M with values in the adjoint bundle AdQ. That is to say, the space AQ of adapted connections is an affine space
for Ω1(AdQ).

The torsion of an adapted connection defines a map

to 2-forms with coefficients in TM. This map is linear; its linearization 

is called the algebraic torsion map. Given two adapted connections ∇ and ∇′, their torsion tensors T∇, T∇′ differ by τ(∇−∇′). Therefore, the image of T∇ in coker(τ) is independent from the choice of ∇.

The image of T∇ in coker(τ) for any adapted connection ∇ is called the torsion of the G-structure. A G-structure is said to be torsion-free if its torsion vanishes. This happens precisely when Q admits a torsion-free adapted connection.

Example: Torsion for almost complex structures 

An example of a G-structure is an almost complex structure, that is, a reduction
of a structure group of an even-dimensional manifold to GL(n,C). Such a reduction is uniquely determined by a C∞-linear endomorphism J ∈ End(TM) such that J2 = −1. In this situation, the torsion can be computed explicitly as follows.

An easy dimension count shows that

,

where Ω2,0(TM) is a space of forms B ∈ Ω2(TM) which satisfy

Therefore, the torsion of an almost complex structure can be considered as an element in 
Ω2,0(TM). It is easy to check that the torsion of an almost complex structure is equal to its Nijenhuis tensor.

Higher order G-structures 

Imposing integrability conditions on a particular G-structure (for instance, with the case of a symplectic form) can be dealt with via the process of prolongation.  In such cases, the prolonged G-structure cannot be identified with a G-subbundle of the bundle of linear frames.  In many cases, however, the prolongation is a principal bundle in its own right, and its structure group can be identified with a subgroup of a higher-order jet group.  In which case, it is called a higher order G-structure [Kobayashi].  In general, Cartan's equivalence method applies to such cases.

See also
 G2-structure

Notes

References

 
 

Differential geometry
Structures on manifolds